The 1961 Dutch Grand Prix was a Formula One motor race held on 22 May 1961 at Zandvoort. It was race 2 of 8 in both the 1961 World Championship of Drivers and the 1961 International Cup for Formula One Manufacturers.

Taking place one week after the Monaco Grand Prix, there was no time for Innes Ireland to heal from his injury in the previous race, so he was replaced by Trevor Taylor. The front row was taken up by three Ferraris. Wolfgang von Trips took the lead from the start and led every lap. Phil Hill was second but was soon pressured by Jim Clark, who had started from the fourth row. The two would trade second place often with the Ferrari quicker on the straight and the Lotus faster in the corners. This continued until about 20 laps from the end when Clark's handling allowed the Ferrari to pull away. Fourth place was contested between Stirling Moss and Richie Ginther, with Moss passing Ginther on the final lap. The race was the first of 13 races in Formula 1 history in which every car that started the race was classified as a finisher. In addition, no drivers made any pit stops; only one of only two World Championship races in history to have this latter distinction - the other being the 2021 Belgian Grand Prix - which was red-flagged after two full laps due to bad weather.

Classification

Qualifying

Race

Championship standings after the race

Drivers' Championship standings

Constructors' Championship standings

 Notes: Only the top five positions are included for both sets of standings.

References

Dutch Grand Prix
Dutch Grand Prix
Grand Prix
Dutch Grand Prix